Ford Block is a historic commercial building located at Oneonta in Otsego County, New York. It is a large, three story brick building in a modified Queen Anne style. It was built between 1881 and 1882 and is built of load-bearing brick walls and covered by a flat composition roof.  The first floor is a series of storefronts; the second window openings on the second level have segmental arches and those on the third floor round arches.  In 1975, it was saved from demolition as part of the urban renewal of Oneonta by a group of local businessmen.

It was listed on the National Register of Historic Places in 1984. It is located within the Oneonta Downtown Historic District established in 2003.

References

Commercial buildings on the National Register of Historic Places in New York (state)
Queen Anne architecture in New York (state)
Commercial buildings completed in 1882
Buildings and structures in Otsego County, New York
National Register of Historic Places in Otsego County, New York
Individually listed contributing properties to historic districts on the National Register in New York (state)